An order of brachiopods containing the families:
 Suborder Billingsellidina
 Superfamily Billingselloidea
 Family Billingsellidae
 Suborder Clitambonitidina
 Superfamily Clitambonitoidea
 Family Clitambonitidae
 Family Gonambonitidae
 Superfamily Polytoechioidea
 Family Polytoechiidae

References

Strophomenata